Frostlendet Valley is an ice-filled valley, about  long, draining northeastward along the south side of Hogfonna Mountain, in the Borg Massif of Queen Maud Land, Antarctica. It was mapped by Norwegian cartographers from surveys and air photos by the Norwegian–British–Swedish Antarctic Expedition (1949–52) and named Frostlendet (the frost ground).

See also
 History of Antarctica
 List of Antarctic expeditions

References

External links
 Scientific Committee on Antarctic Research (SCAR)

Valleys of Queen Maud Land
Princess Martha Coast